Paratió (Prarto) is an extinct and poorly attested language of Brazil. It appears to have been related to Xukuru.

It was originally spoken on the Capibaribe River, and was reported by Loukotka (1968) to have been spoken by a few individuals in Cimbres.

References

Extinct languages of South America
Xukuruan languages
Indigenous languages of Northeastern Brazil